Anny Miletty (1898–1948) was an Austrian film actress of the silent era, best known for her role in the 1924 film The City Without Jews. In 1925 she married the film director Hans Karl Breslauer and ended her film career.

Selected filmography
 Oh, Dear Augustine (1922)
 The House of Molitor (1922)
 The City Without Jews (1924)

References

Bibliography
 Robert Von Dassanowsky. Austrian Cinema: A History. McFarland, 2005.

External links

1898 births
1948 deaths
Austrian film actresses
Austrian silent film actresses
Actresses from Vienna